Nicholas Castle is an American screenwriter, film director, and actor. He is known for playing Michael Myers in John Carpenter's horror film Halloween (1978). He reprised the role in Halloween (2018), and its sequels Halloween Kills (2021) and Halloween Ends (2022). Castle also co-wrote Escape from New York (1981) with Carpenter. After Halloween, Castle became a director, taking the helm of films such as The Last Starfighter (1984), The Boy Who Could Fly (1986), Dennis the Menace (1993), and Major Payne (1995).

Career
Castle's film credits include Dark Star where he played the beach ball alien, Major Payne, Dennis the Menace, The Last Starfighter, and Connors' War as a director.  He wrote the screenplays for the films Escape from New York and Hook. He was the writer and director of the film Tap.

In 1978, he played the iconic starring role of Michael Myers in the classic horror film Halloween, directed by former USC classmate John Carpenter, and was paid 25 dollars a day. Castle's subsequent collaborations with Carpenter included his name being used as one of the main characters' names in The Fog, co-writing the script of Escape From New York, and performing the title song of Big Trouble in Little China as part of the band The Coup De Villes, alongside Carpenter and another friend, Tommy Lee Wallace. After Halloween, Castle had his directorial debut in Tag: The Assassination Game, followed by taking the helm of films such as The Last Starfighter, The Boy Who Could Fly, Dennis the Menace, and Major Payne.

Castle wrote August Rush, a musical-drama directed by Kirsten Sheridan and starring Freddie Highmore, Jonathan Rhys-Meyers, Robin Williams, and Keri Russell, which was released in 2007. He also stars as himself in the 2010 documentary Halloween: The Inside Story by Filipino filmmaker Nick Noble.

In 2018, Castle reprised his role as Michael Myers in the direct sequel, Halloween, directed by David Gordon Green, becoming the third actor to play Michael Myers more than once. The announcement of Nick Castle's participation was widely reported as his retaking the role of Michael Myers he originated, with stunt performer James Jude Courtney only doing additional work as the character. However, an interview with Courtney revealed that Castle's screentime was minimal and that the great majority of the work under the mask was done by Courtney himself, which led to the question of whether the return of Castle had been misrepresented by the production. While Courtney was involved in every scene featuring Myers, including those of Castle, who was only involved for a minimal amount of filming, which Castle described to the journalists on set as a cameo appearance, Castle reprises his role in one scene with Jamie Lee Curtis and did all of Michael Myers' breathing sounds in post-production. Courtney referred to collaborating with Castle as an "honor", while Castle described it as a "passing of the torch". On July 26, 2019, it was confirmed that Castle would return for the sequels to the 2018 film, Halloween Kills (2021) and Halloween Ends (2022) for some scenes as Michael Myers, with James Jude Courtney again playing Myers for a majority of the films.

Castle won a Saturn Award for Best Writing for The Boy Who Could Fly, a Silver Raven (for Delivering Milo), a Grand Prize (for The Last Starfighter), a Bronze Gryphon, and a Gold Medal of the Regional Council.

Filmography

Film

Television

References

External links

1947 births
American male film actors
American male screenwriters
Male actors from Los Angeles
Living people
Film directors from California
USC School of Cinematic Arts alumni
Screenwriters from California
20th-century American male actors
21st-century American male actors
Writers from Los Angeles
20th-century American male writers
21st-century American male writers